Amos Gitai (born 11 October 1950) is an Israeli filmmaker, who was trained as an architect.

Gitai's work was presented in several major retrospectives in Pompidou Center in Paris, the Museum of Modern Art (MoMA) and Lincoln Center in New York, and the British Film Institute in London. To date, Amos Gitai has created over 90 works of art, including a wide variety of formats such as feature and short films, fiction and documentaries, experimental work, television productions, installations and theater works.

Between 1999 and 2017 ten of his films participated in the Cannes Film Festival for the Palme d'Or as well as The Venice International Film Festival for the Golden Lion award.

He has worked with Juliette Binoche, Jeanne Moreau, Natalie Portman, Yael Abecassis, Samuel Fuller, Hanna Schygulla, Annie Lennox, Barbara Hendricks, Léa Seydoux, Valeria Bruni Tedeschi, Henri Alekan, Renato Berta, Nurith Aviv, Éric Gautier and more. Since 2000 he has been collaborating with the French screenwriter Marie-José Sanselme.

He received several prestigious prizes, in particular the Leopard of Honor at the Locarno International Film Festival (2008), the Roberto Rossellini prize (2005), the Robert Bresson prize (2013), the Paradjanov prize (2014) and Légion d'Honneur (2017). In 2018, Amos Gitai has been elected professor at the chair of artistic creation at the Collège de France, with a series of 12 lessons on cinema. In 2019 he received the Grande Ufficiale dell'Ordine della Stella Italia.

Early life
Gitai was born to Munio Weinraub, an architect formed at the pre-war German Bauhaus art school, and to Efratia Margalit, an intellectual, a storyteller and a teacher. He graduated from the Hebrew Reali School in Haifa in 1968. He holds a degree in architecture from the Technion in Haifa and a PhD in architecture from the University of California, Berkeley.

In 1973, during the Yom Kippur War, Gitai had to interrupt his architecture studies as he was called up to the reserve service as part of a helicopter rescue crew. Gitai was wounded when the helicopter he was in was hit by a Syrian missile. During his missions, he used a Super 8 camera to document the war. After the war, he embarked on a career as a filmmaker and made his first documentary in 1980, House.

Film career
Gitai began his career directing mostly documentaries. In 1980 he directed his first full-length film House, that follows a house in West Jerusalem, abandoned during the 1948 war by its Palestinian owner. In the film, Gitai follows the different house tenants over the years, making the house the focus of the Israeli socio-political conflict. It opens a democratic cinematic space around the same house where a split of perspectives on the situation and its history takes place.

The film was rejected and censored by the Israeli television, an event which marks the filmmaker's conflictual relationship with the authorities of his country. It is to make this film exist in spite of the censorship and to continue along the path he had just begun, that he says at that time: "I decided to become a filmmaker". This relationship was soon to be fueled by the controversy surrounding of his film Field Diary, made before and during the invasion of Lebanon in 1982, and resulting in a long exile in France (1983-1993).

House was the first part of a trilogy including the films A House in Jerusalem (1998), News from Home / News from House (2005). It was a first trilogy of many others; a concept Gitai consistently worked with during his career, offering a complex and layered view on the geopolitical Israeli reality.

To his biographical elements (his family origins, the generation to which he belongs, his architectural studies, the making of House and its effects) must be added the experience of the Yom Kippur War, in which he almost died at the age of 23, an experience that would influence all his future work. The traumatic event itself is the focus of a series of experimental short films and documentaries, before directing the film Yom Kippur in 2000, which definitively consecrated its stature after its positive reception at the Cannes Film Festival. The evocation of this intimate and common experience served by an impressive plastic sense is exemplary of Amos Gitai's art. The film also marks the beginning of the director's collaboration with screenwriter Marie-José Sanselme that dates until today.

He continues with the making of the three Wadi (Wadi 1981, Wadi Ten Years After 1991, Wadi Grand Canyon 2001) which similar to House is dealing with a specific location and examines the complex relationships between the residents of the former stone quarry - Eastern European immigrants, survivors of the camps and Arabs who have also been expelled from their homes due to the wars in Israel. Gitai turns the valley into a symbol of a possible coexistence.

HIs third trilogy deals with the Israeli political-military practices (Field Diary, 1982; Giving Peace a Chance, 1994; The Arena of Murder, 1996). Yann Lardeau wrote about Field Diary:

He continues with the making of the trilogy on the procedures of world capitalism (Pineapple, 1984; Bangkok-Bahrain/Labour for Sale, 1984; Orange, 1998) and the trilogy on the resurgence of the European extreme right (In the Wupper Valley, 1993; In the Name of the Duce/Naples-Rome, 1994; Queen Mary '87, 1995). But also trilogies of fiction, trilogies of exile (Esther, 1985; Berlin-Jerusalem, 1989; Golem, the spirit of exile, 1991), trilogies of cities (Devarim, 1995; Yom Yom, 1998 ; Kadosh, 1999), trilogy of historical events decisive for Israel (Yom Kippur, 2000; Eden, 2001; Kedma, 2002 and trilogy of borders (Promised Land, 2004; Free Zone, 2005; Disengagement, 2007).

He then devotes a diptych to his parents, with the first film Carmel (2009), which is an intimate reflection on the correspondence of his mother Efratia (Gallimard, 2010). The second film Lullaby to my Father (2012) traces the journey of his father Munio Gitai Weinraub from

his childhood in Silesia, his Bauhaus studies with Mies van der Rohe and Hannes Meyer at the time of the rise to power and the conquest of power by the Nazis.

Gitai conducts a tireless research on aesthetic means, which is anchored in the experimental uses of the camera from adolescence, and goes through the assertive stylisation of early fiction under the claimed influence of Bertolt Brecht and expressionism, as well as through the search for filming devices adapted to particular projects. One of the stylistic figures most willingly employed by Amos Gitai is the sequence shot, the long duration of the recording being used for multiple purposes never limited to visual seduction, but always in search of meaningful effects. A committed artist, Gitai is also the inventor of unexpected dramatic structures, such as the asymmetrical doubling of Berlin-Jerusalem, the spatial blocks of Alila or the temporal blocks of One day you'll understand (2008), the destabilizing fluidity of the Promised Land, the critical superimpositions of The Arena of Murder and Free Zone, to the abruptly broken-in-two narrative of Disengagement (2007) or the single 81-minute sequence shot of Ana Arabia (2013), which depicts a moment in the life of a small community of Jewish and Arab outsiders on the outskirts of Jaffa.

In 2015, his film The Last Day of Yitzhak Rabin was presented in competition at the Venice Mostra and then at the Toronto International Film Festival. Twenty years after the assassination of the Israeli Prime Minister by a religious right-wing student on November 4, 1995, in Tel Aviv, Gitai looks
back on this traumatic event. Placing the assassination in its political and social context, Yitzhak Rabin's Last Day mixes fictional reconstructions and archival footage in this political thriller that is also about the growing crisis in contemporary Israeli society. 

In 2016, Gitai continues the work he began with his film The Last Day of Yitzhak Rabin in an installation presented first at the Maxxi Museum, Rome, under the title 'Chronicle of an Assassination Foretold', then at the BOZAR Museum in Brussels and at the Fondation Lambert in Avignon (spring/summer 2016). Ceramics, photographs, video installations and archival documents take up space to offer a new reading of the events leading up to Yitzhak Rabin's assassination.

This latest exhibition echoes a theatrical performance given in the Cour d'Honneur of the Palais des Papes on 10 July 2016 for the Avignon Festival. Based on the memories of Leah Rabin, Yitzhak Rabin's wife, Amos Gitai imagines an "able with four female protagonists, two actresses, Hiam Abbass and Sarah Adler, and two musicians, Edna Stern (piano) and Sonia Wieder-Atherton (cello), four voices associated in a recitative mode, between lament and lullaby, which go back in time.

Also in 2016, a 540-page book dedicated to Amos Gitai is published by the Enrico Navarra Gallery and the Sébastien Moreu publishing house. The book includes more than 250 reproductions from films, location scouting and filming, as well as family archives, Amos Gitai's creations and interviews with Hans-Ulrich Obrist, Arthur Miller, Hou Hanru, Guy Amsellem, Annette Michelson, Richard Ingersoll, Élisabeth Lebovici and Stephan Levine.

35 years after Field Diary (1982), Gitai returns to the West Bank with West of the Jordan River (2017), which describes the relationship between Israelis and Palestinians today. A tribute to those, "civilian or military, known or anonymous, who, in Israel, have not renounced reconciliation with the Palestinians", the film is presented in the Directors' Fortnight13 at the Cannes Film Festival.

2018 is a year of intense activity for the director, invited by the Venice Mostra to present two films in the competition of the Venice Film Festival. A Tramway in Jerusalem (2019) is a themed comedy that humorously observes moments of daily life on the Jerusalem tramway. The film stars 36 Israeli actors Yaël Abecassis, Hanna Laszlo, singer Noa Achinoam Nini, Palestinians and Europeans Mathieu Amalric and Pippo Delbono. On this tramway line that connects several neighborhoods in Jerusalem, from east to west, recording their variety and differences, this comedy humorously looks at moments in the daily lives of a few passengers, brief encounters that reveal a whole mosaic of human beings. It is these fragments of stories and memories that make up the contemporary reality of Israel.

The film is preceded by Amos Gitai's A Letter to a Friend in Gaza (2018, 34 mins, in Hebrew & Arabic), which responds to the current crisis between Israel and Gaza. Tao Palestinians and two Israelis read texts inspired by Mahmoud Darwish, Yizhar Smilansky, Emile Habibi and Amira Hass, as an homage to a famous letter written by Albert Camus in 1943, which gives its title to the film.

The work of the filmmaker Amos Gitai has nearly 90 titles, made over approximately 40 years. To these must be added video installations, theatre productions and books. His work is indeed varied, but this diversity is extremely coherent. Over the years, travels, struggles, exile, encounters, Amos Gitaï articulates and re-articulates works which, in their shimmering, never cease to respond to and echo each other. He is now one of the most respected filmmakers on the international scene, and continues to explore new narrative and stylistic avenues, always in relation to contemporary reality, even when the narrative takes a detour into the historical or mythological past.

Novel adaptations
Gitai created several novel adaptations. Devarim is an adaptation of Yaakov Shabtai's Past Continuous. One day you'll understand ("Plus tard tu comprendras", 2008) is based on an autobiographical book by Jérôme Clément, president of the Arte television channel and one of the leading figures of French culture, and tells the story of a French writer tracing the story of his Jewish mother (Jeanne Moreau) and her family during World War II.
  Roses à crédit (2010) is an adaptation of the novel by Elsa Triolet and takes a look at the materialist, post-war world of the French lower middle-class.  The film was shot entirely in France.

In 2014 he directs the film Tsili , inspired by the novel by Aharon Appelfeld, and tells the story of the wandering of its heroine submerged in the nightmare of the Second World War. Tsili, a young Jewish woman, gathers all the forces of intuition and vitality to survive in this desperate universe. 
starring Sarah Adler, Meshi Olinski, and Lea Koenig.
adapted from a novel by Aharon Appelfeld, he returns to the Second World War and the Holocaust:

Exhibitions and publications
Cinema installations, exhibitions and book publications are integral to Gitai's work. He has exhibited and published in leading institutions in Israel and around the world such as the Israel Museum in Jerusalem, the Tel Aviv Museum, the Pompidou Center in Paris, MoMa in New York, the Reina Sofia Museum in Madrid and more. Many of his exhibitions were dedicated to his parents Munio and Efratia, such as the 1996 retrospective initiated at the Pompidou Center, which deals with the work of his father (the only retrospective devoted to an Israeli architect in the Paris Museum) or the publication of his mother's letters - Efratia Gitai's letters in 1994.

In 2011, he presents the exhibition Traces at the Palais de Tokyo in Paris, the Bauhaus Museum in Dessau, Germany and the Art Museum at Kibbutz Ein Harod in Israel. In Traces, Gitai creates an audio-visual stroll with great intimacy through images taken from fourteen of his films. Images and sounds, side by side, of destroyed walls in World War II, in them stolen property of the Jews living there, or of a crowd chanting "Mussolini" during Mussolini's granddaughter's election campaign in a video taken in Auschwitz. From the violent reality of the Middle East to the soft waltz of a veteran couple on the evening of their arrest. The journey Gitai offered is challenging and shaky, evoking the violence of its history and echoes, and creating a personal reflection on the xenophobia that can change fates. In doing so, Gitai builds the sensitive conditions for sharing the memory of places and of events.

In the same year, Gitai inaugurated the Museum of Architecture Munio Gitai Weinrov in his father's old offices in Haifa.

After directing his film Rabin, The Last Day in 2015, Gitai continues investigating Rabin's murder in presenting the exhibition Yitzhak Rabin : Chronicle of an Assassination, presented at the MAXXI Museum in Rome, Italy, at the BOZAR Museum in Brussels, Belgium and at the Fondation Lambert in Avignon, France. Through working with ceramics, photographs and video installations, Gitai enables a new reading of the events leading up to the murder.

He also presents the exhibition Before and After, featuring two experimental films he filmed on his Super 8 camera during the 1973 Yom Kippur War. The film Before and After and Black and White are exhibited along with still photographs. In Before and after, Gitai returns to the his traumatic injury during a helicopter crash from which he managed to escape. The Super 8 camera shows the military jacket he wore at the time of the accident. It becomes the film's central figure. Along with the series of photographs presented, Gitai continues his post-mortem decoding work of the moment the experience becomes a personal memory. It is a process in which the subject disappears; What appears in its place is extreme compression of thick, grainy material, which translates to the stigma of the time and makes a picturesque feeling appear. What artistic situations can give a proper description of that event, to that trauma? What traces remain in memory - a few weeks after, or forty years after? The artist's journey is mutually and simultaneously fed by both film and still photography.

In July 2016, a 540-page book on Amos Gitai was published by Galerie Enrico Navarra and Sébastien Moreu. The book includes more than 250 reproductions from movies and research, but also family archives and creations by Amos Gitai and 7 conversations between Gitai and : Hans-Ulrich Obrist, Guy Amsellem, Arthur Miller, Hou Hanru, Annette Michelson, Richard Ingersoll, Elisabeth Lebovici & Stephan Levine), two poems (Mount Carmel and Lullaby to My Father) and a poetic essay on the Golem.

Theatrical performances

In Gitai's body of work can also be found stage works. Like his cinematic interest, also in his theatrical pieces, Gitai focuses on the tension between the personal and the historical, between the local and the universal. Many of his works have been presented at leading institutions around the world, such as the Avignon Festival in France, the Paris Philharmonic and the Lincoln Center in New York. Among his works, Metamorphosis of a Melody that opened the Venice Biennale in 1993 and The War of the Sons of Light Against the Sons of Darkness with Jeanne Moreau that was presented in Festival d'Avignon in 2009 and in Odeon Theater in Paris in 2010.

At the same year he created the piece Efratia Gitai: Letters, which premiered at the Odeon Theater in Paris in 2010. Similar to The War of the Sons of Light Against the Sons of Darkness, Gitai worked with Jeanne Moreau who was reading his mother's letters. 

Another piece is Yitzhak Rabin : Chronicle of an Assassination, created following the movie Rabin, The Last Day (2015) and premiered at the 2016 Avignon Festival. In this work, Gitai draws on the memories of Leah Rabin, the prime minister's wife, and produces like a parable liberated from all formalism. Four female heroines, four voices reciting the text that becomes a text between lament and lullaby, recreate the unprecedented course of history and violence in which the nationalist forces opposed the peace project led by Yitzhak Rabin, by defection and incitement. Four voices taken, as if "in an echo chamber," between documentary imagery and extracts from classical literature - the same vivid memory that always accompanied the filmmaker and director in his understanding of Israeli state and society.

In 2019, the stage version of A Letter to a Friend in Gaza premiered at the Spoleto Festival in the United States. The piece is of a captivating, demanding, challenging and lyrical multimedia. At a time when art and entertainment are often synonymous, the play restores confidence in the theater's ability to ask difficult political and cultural questions. The audience cannot remain passive, and takes on the difficult task of understanding the theatrical experience in the face of his thoughts, perceptions and opinions regarding the Israeli-Palestinian conflict. Instead of proposing theory or solution, the play serves as a powerful trigger for much-needed political imagination. A Letter to a Friend in Gaza was originally a 34-minute film screened in 2018 at the Venice Festival. It was Nigel Redon, the director of the Spoleto Festival, who suggested Gitai to work on a stage version for the festival. His film and stage work share texts and actors, yet, paradoxically, the structure and feel of the film seem more theatrical, while the open horizon and stratified composition of the half-hour theatrical version give the impression of cinema.

Teachings and conferences
Amos Gitai often teaches and attends conferences around the world. In 2017, he was a guest professor at University of California, Berkeley, where he studied in his youth. His lectures focused on his documentary and fictional work. Through the screening of several films, the audience was able to dive into Israel's political and social issues. As a skilled architect, Gitai has a unique way of understanding and representing a human experience through time and space, and through the films House, City and Border, Gitai managed to present a complex narrative and image of Israel in the context of a larger global discourse.

In 2018, after being elected as chair in Artistic Creation at the Collége de France in Paris, Gitai was invited to give a series of 12 lessons and lectures on his cinematic work through an ethical, political and artistic lens, called 'Crossing the Borders'. His lessons were: The documentary as metaphor; "I don't politicise my films, they have politicised me"; Depicting War; Space and Structure, Cinema and Architecture; Cinema and History; Is Cinema More Authoritarian Than Literature?; Collective Mythologies and Memories; Chronicle of an Assassination.

In 2019, he was a guest professor at Columbia University in New York.

Filmography

Fiction

 Laila in Haifa (2020)
 A Tramway in Jerusalem (2018)
 Rabin, the Last Day (2015)
 Tsili (2014)
 Ana Arabia (2013)
 Lullaby to My Father (2011)
  (2010)
  (2010)
  (2009)
 One Day You Will Understand (Plus tard tu compremderas (2008)
 Disengagement (2007)
 Free Zone (2005)
 Promised Land (2004)
 Alila (2003)
 Kedma (2002)
  (2001)
 Kippur (2000)
 Kadosh (1999)
  (1998)
  (1995)
 Golem The Petrified Garden (1993)
 Golem, the Spirit of Exile (1991)
 Birth of a Golem (1990)
 Berlin-Jerusalem (1989)
 Esther (1985)

Documentaries
 Letter to A Friend in Gaza (2019)
 West of the Jordan River (2017)
 Reflections on Architecture (2016)
 Architecture in Israel: Conversations with Amos Gitai (2013)
 The War of the Sons of Light Against the Sons of Darkness (2009)
 New from Home / News from House (2005)
 Wadi Grand Canyon 2001 (2001)
 Zion, Auto-Emancipation (1998)
  (1998)
 Orange (Tapuz) (1998)
 Kippur, War Memories (1997)
 War and Peace in Vesoul (1997)
 The Arena of murder (1996)
 Munio Weinraub Gitai Architect (1909-1970) (1996)
 Milim (1996)
 Metamorphosis of a Melody (1996)
 Queen Mary '87  (1994)
 Give Peace a Chance (1994)
Part 1: In the Land of Oranges
Part 2: Political Route
Part 3: Writers Speak
Part 4: Theater For Life
 In the Name of the Duce (1994)
 In the Valley of the Wupper (1993)
 Wadi, Ten Years After (1991)
 Brand New Day (1987)
 Reagan: Image for Sale (1984)
 Bangkok-Bahrein/Labour for sale (1984) 
 Pineapple (Ananas) (1983)
 Field Diary (Yoman sade) (1982)
  Wadi (1981)
 American Mythologies (1981)
 In Search of Identity (1980)
 House (Bayit) (1980)
 Wadi Salib Riots (1979)

Short films
 Words With Gods (2014)
 The Book of Amos (2012)
 The Dybbuk of Haifa (2007)
 September 11 - 11'09'01'  (2002)
 Surgeon General's Warning (2001)
 Reagan: Image for Sale (1984)
 American Mythologies (1981)
 In Search of Identity (1980)
 Cultural Celebrities (1979)
 Jimmy Carter's visit in Israel (1979)
 Wadi Rushmia (1978)
 Architectura (1978)
 Under the Water (1977)
 Singing in Afula (1977)
 Public House (1977)
 Political Myths (1977)
 Hagvul (The Border) (1977)
 Dimitri (1977)
 Charisma (1975)
 My Mother at the Seashore (1975)
 Lucy (1974)
 Blowing Glass (1974)
 The International Orthodontist Congress (1974)
 Pictures in the Exhibition (1974)
 Memphis U.S.A (part 2) (1974)
 Memphis U.S.A. (Faces) (1974)
 Water (1974)
 Ahare (Images After War) (1974)
 Images of War 1, 2, 3 (1974)
 Arlington U.S.A (1974)
 Shosh (1973)
 Talking About Ecology (1973)
 Fire Eats Paper, Paper Eats Fire (1973)
 Memories of a comrade of the 2nd Aliya (1972)
 Windows in David Pinsky no.5 (1972)
 Souk Women’s dialogues (1972)
 Waves (Galim) (1972)
 Geography according to Modern man and His Control on the Environnement (1972)
 Textures (1972)
 Black Is White (1972)
 Details of Architecture (1972)
 Arts and Crafts and Technology (1972)

Exhibitions/Installations
 Promised Lands, Palazzo Vecchio, Sala d'Arme, Florence, Italy, 2022
 Champs de mémoire, Théâtre de la Ville, Paris, France, 2019
 The Law of the Pursuer, SAVVY Contemporary, Berlin, Allemagne, 2017
 Yitzhak Rabin: Chronicle of an Assassination, MAXXI, Rome, Italie, 2016; Bozar-Centre for Fine Arts, Bruxelles, Belgique, 2016; Collection Lambert, Avignon, France, 2016; Galerie 75 Faubourg, Paris, France, 2017
 Amos Gitai Before and After, Galerie Thaddaeus Ropac, Salzbourg, Villa Kast, Autriche, 2015
 Amos Gitai Architecte de la mémoire, Cinémathèque française, Paris, France, 2014; Musée de l’Élysée, Lausanne, Suisse, 2015; Cinéma Galeries, Bruxelles, Belgique, 2015
 Amos Gitai Strade | Ways Talking to Gabriele – Carpet – Lullaby to my Father, Palazzo Reale, Salle des Cariatides, Milan, Italie, 2014–15
 Amos Gitai Army Days Horizontal. Army Days Vertical, Galerie Thaddeus Ropac, Espace de Pantin, France, 2014
 Las biografías de Amos Gitai, Museo Nacional Centro de Arte Reina Sofía, Madrid, Spain, 2014
 Before and After, Galerie Thaddeus Ropac, Espace de Pantin, France, 2014; Villa Kast, Salzbourg, Austria 2015
 Disaster – The End of Days, Galerie Thaddeus Ropac, Espace de Pantin, France, 2014
 Amos Gitai Architecture de la mémoire, Église des Frères-Prêcheurs, Rencontres photographiques de Arles, France, 2012
 Amos Gitai Architetture della memoria, Mole Antonelliana, Museo Nazionale del Cinema, Turin, Italie, 2011- 2012
 Traces. Lullaby to My Father, Museum of Art, Ein Harod, Israel, 2011; Meisterhaus Vassily Kandinsky/Paul Klee – Dining room, Bauhaus, Dessau, Germany, 2011
 Traces. Efratia’s Correspondence, Museum of Art, Ein Harod, Israel, 2011
 Traces - Munio Gitai Weinraub, Museum of Art, Ein Harod,  Israel, 2011
 Amos Gitai Traces, Palais de Tokyo, Paris, France, 2011
 Lullaby for my father, a video presentation in Kibbutz Kfar Masaryk, Israel, 2010
 Amos Gitai Citations, Biennale Evento, Base sous-marine, Bordeaux, France, 2009
 Munio Weinraub, Amos Gitai Architektur und Film in Israel, Pinakothek der Moderne-Architektur Museum, Munich, Germany, 2009; Tel Aviv Museum of Art, Israel, 2009
 Amos Gitai: Non-Fiction, MoMA, New York, 2008
 Amos Gitai News From House News From Home, Kunst-Werke, Berlin, Germany, 2006; Centre chorégraphique national, Montpellier, France, 2006
 In memory of Munio Gitai Weinraub, Centre Pompidou, Paris, France, 2006
 Amos Gitai Parcours, Centre Pompidou, Paris, France, 2003
 Public Housing, Museum of Art, Ein Harod, Israel; Herzliya museum of contemporary art, Herzliya, Israel; Saitama Museum of Modern Art, Saitama, Japan, 2000; Jerusalem Museum, Israel, 1994
 Opening Chen Zhen, Helena Rubinstein Pavillon, Tel Aviv, Israel, 1998
 Recycling Exhibition, Israel Museum, Jerusalem, Israel, 1975

Performances
 Yitzhak Rabin: Chronicle of an Assassination, Theatre de la Ville, Paris, France, 2021; Coronet Theater of London, UK, 2021; Philharmonie de Paris, France, 2018; John Anson Ford Theater, Los Angeles, USA, 2017; Lincoln Center Festival, New York, USA, 2017; Festival d'Avignon, France, 2016
Interior Exiles, Theatre de la Ville, Paris, France, 2020
Otello, Teatro di San Carlo, Naples, Italy, 2016
A Reading of Efratia Gitai Correspondence, Odéon-Théâtre de l’Europe, Paris, France, 2010;Coronet Theater of London, UK, 2019; MoMa, New York, USA, 2020
 Letter to a Friend in Gaza, Coronet Theater of London, UK, 2019; Theatre de la Ville, Paris, France, 2019; Emmet Robinson Theater, Spoleto Festival, Charleston, USA, 2019
 The War of the Sons of Light Against the Sons of Darkness, Odéon-Théâtre de l’Europe, Paris, France 2010; Festival d'Avignon, France, 2009; Fortress Rumeli Hisari, Istanbul, Turkey, 2009; Venice Biennale, Italy, 1993
 Metamorphosis of a Melody, Venice Biennale, 1993; Gibellina, Sicily, Italy, 1992

Books
Amos Gitai / Yitzhak Rabin Chroniques d'un assassinat, Antoine de Baeque, Patrick Boucheron, Ouzi Elyada, Amos Gitai, Marie-José Sanselme, Éditions Gallimard / Bibliothèque nationale de France, Paris, 2021
Efratia Gitai Correspondence, Rivka Markovizky (ed.), CPL Editions (Memoirs & Biographies) Centro Primo Levi, New York, 2018 – ISBN 1941046258; (In Hebrew) Yediot Aharonot, Tel-Aviv, 2011
 Efratia Gitai,  (1929–1994), Rivka Markovizky (dir.), Éditions Gallimard, Paris, 2010
 Genèses, Jean-Michel Frodon, Amos Gitai, Marie-José Sanselme, Éditions Gallimard, Paris, 2009
Munio Weinraub / Amos Gitai – Architektur und Film in Israel, Architektur Museum - Pinakothek der Moderne, Munich, 2008
News from Home, Amos Gitai, Walther König, Köln, 2006
 Monte Carmelo, Amos Gitai, Bompiani, Milano, 2004
 Mont Carmel, Amos Gitai, Éditions Gallimard, 2003
 Parcours, Amos Gitai, Centre Pompidou, Paris, 2003
Kippour (scénario), Amos Gitai, Marie-José Sanselme,  Arte Editions / 00h00.com, Paris, 2003
 The War of the Sons of Light Against the Sons of Darkness, Amos Gitai, Mazzotta, Milano, 1993

Books on Amos Gitai's work
 Amos Gitai, Galerie Enrico Navarra, éditions Sébastien Moreu, Paris, 2016
Amos Gitai architecte de la mémoire, Serge Toubiana, Paul Willemen, Jean-Michel Frodon, Hans Ulrich Obrist, Annette Michelson, Marie-José Sanselme, Mathieu Orléan, Éditions Gallimard/Cinémathèque française, Paris, 2014
Genèses, Jean-Michel Frodon, Amos Gitai, Marie-José Sanselme, Éditions Gallimard, Paris, 2009.
 Cinema di Amos Gitai: Frontiere e territori (Il), Serge Toubiana, Bruno Mondadori, Torino, 2006
 Amos Gitai: News from Home, Walther König, Köln, 2006
 The Cinema of Amos Gitai,Serge Toubiana, Baptiste Piégay, Lincoln Center / Cahiers du cinéma, Paris, 2005
 Amos Gitai, Serge Toubiana, Mostra internacional de cinema / Cosac Naify, São Paulo, 2004
 Exilios y territories, el cine de Amos Gitai, Serge Toubiana, Baptiste Piégay, Semana Internacional de Cine, Valladolid, 2004
 Exils et territoires: le cinéma d'Amos Gitai, Serge Toubiana, Baptiste Piégay, Arte Editions / Cahiers du cinéma, Paris, 2003
 Amos Gitai, Cinema, Politics, Aesthetics, Irma Klein, KM, Tel Aviv, 2003
 Amos Gitai, Cinema forza di pace, Edited by Daniela Turco, Le Mani, Genova, 2002
 Munio Gitai Weinraub, Bauhaus architect in Israel, Richard Ingersoll, Electa, Milano, 1994
 The Films of Amos Gitai, a Montage, Edited by Paul Willemen, BFI Publishing, London, 1993
 Amos Gitai, Edited by Alberto Farassino, Mostra Internazionale Riminicinema, Rimini, 1989

References

Amos Gitai: Exile and Atonement, Ray Privett, Cinema Purgatorio, 2008.

External links

 Official website 
 
 Amos Gitai, Hollywood.com

1950 births
Living people
People from Haifa
Israeli filmmakers
French film directors
Israeli male screenwriters
Israeli architects
Israeli Jews
Israeli film directors
Roberto Rossellini Prize recipients
Israeli people of the Yom Kippur War
Hebrew Reali School alumni
UC Berkeley College of Environmental Design alumni